(Let exultation sound loudly), WAB 76,  is a festive song composed by Anton Bruckner in 1854.

History 
Bruckner composed this "cantata" on a text of Hillischer in 1854.

The piece was intended to be sung by the  Frohsinn for the Joyous Entry of Elisabeth of Bavaria, then the bride of Franz Joseph of Austria, known as Sisi, in Linz on 22 April 1854. However, Bruckner's composition was not performed, but instead a transcription of the Bavarian national hymn with the same text by Hillischer.

Another text by Anton August Naaf, "" (To you, lovely homeland, should sound the faithful song of highest love), was used for the music for a performance of the Wiener Schubertbund on 15 June 1898.

Later again, another text was put by Anton Weiss for the Wiener Schubertbund. Bruckner's autograph manuscript is stored in the archive of the Oberösterreichisches Landesarchiv.

A facsimile of the work with Naaf's text was first published in band III/2, pp. 162–179 of the Göllerich/Auer biography, with Hillischer's original text in footnote.

Text 

The text used for the cantata is by Hillischer:

Music 
The 100-bar long work in E-flat major is scored for  choir and brass instruments (2 horns, 2 trumpets and 4 trombones).

The work consists of two related sections and a coda. While the horns and the trumpets are used only to contribute brief fanfare, pedal tones, and occasionally to the roots of otherwise incomplete chords, the four trombones almost always double the voices. Like other Bruckner's works, the work begins with a distinctive motive that provides much of the ensuing musical material. Obvious derivatives of this motive form the beginning and the ending of each section, and all of the imitative passages are based on developments of it. Since no two statements of this tune are identical, it provides both musical unity and variety. The music is of substantial interest, because it contains an attractive blend of progressive and textural variety.

Discography 

There is a single recording of Laßt Jubeltöne laut erklingen:
 Thomas Kerbl, Men choir and brass instrument ensemble of the Anton Bruckner Privatuniversität Linz, Weltliche Männerchöre – CD: LIVA 054, 2012

References

Sources 
 August Göllerich, Anton Bruckner. Ein Lebens- und Schaffens-Bild,  – posthumous edited by Max Auer by G. Bosse, Regensburg, 1932
 Anton Bruckner – Sämtliche Werke, Band XXIII/2:  Weltliche Chorwerke (1843–1893), Musikwissenschaftlicher Verlag der Internationalen Bruckner-Gesellschaft, Angela Pachovsky and Anton Reinthaler (Editor), Vienna, 1989
 Keith William Kinder, The Wind and Wind-Chorus Music of Anton Bruckner, Greenwood Press, Westport, Connecticut, 2000
 Cornelis van Zwol, Anton Bruckner 1824–1896 – Leven en werken, uitg. Thoth, Bussum, Netherlands, 2012. 
 Crawford Howie, Anton Bruckner - A documentary biography, online revised edition

External links 
 Laßt Jubeltöne laut erklingen Es-Dur, WAB 76 Critical discography by Hans Roelofs 
 

Weltliche Chorwerke by Anton Bruckner
1854 compositions
Compositions in E-flat major
1854 songs